Oh! was an Australian cable TV channel owned by Optus Television. It served as the services's premier general entertainment channel until it was replaced by FOX8 in 2002. Programming was mostly sourced from Warner Brothers Television. After the channel's closure, the content was given to Foxtel and XYZnetworks channels, with most of the Warner Brothers shows moving to Arena.

Programming

77 Sunset Strip
Action
ALF
Behind the Music (TV Series VH-1)
 Baby Blues
Babylon 5
 Batman: The Animated Series
The Client
The Crocodile Hunter
 The Drew Carey Show
Family Matters
 Friends
Full House
 Gloria's House
Growing Pains
 Hangin' with Mr. Cooper
Head of the Class
Here's Lucy
WCW Thunder
WCW Saturday Night
I'll Fly Away
La Femme Nikita
Lawless
Lois & Clark: The New Adventures of Superman
The Jenny Jones Show
Maverick
Men in Black: The Series
Mr. & Mrs. Smith
 The Oblongs
The Road Runner Show
Oz
SeaChange
The Secret Life of Us
The Sopranos
Suddenly Susan
Superman: The Animated Series
Trinity
Kung Fu: The Legend Continues
Static Shock
The Zeta Project
Wicked!

References

Defunct television channels in Australia
Television channels and stations established in 1999
Television channels and stations disestablished in 2002
English-language television stations in Australia
1999 establishments in Australia